Northome is a city located in the southwestern corner of Koochiching County, Minnesota, United States. The population was 155 at the 2020 census.

U.S. Highway 71 and State Highways 1 and 46 meet in Northome.

Fair
The Northome Fairgrounds hold the annual Koochiching County Fair on the second weekend of August. It celebrated its 100th anniversary in August 2006.

Fair events include
 Mudding
 Fireworks
 Animal and crafts judging and a related Bear Fest parade in the city of Northome.
 The fair grounds also has the "Harold Lowe Memorial Arena", a horse arena capable of hosting barrel racing and other equine activities

History
Northome was founded in 1903 and enjoyed a boom time early in the 20th century as a logging town.

By the 1930s the big white and red pines were gone and pine trees were essentially locally extirpated due to the unsustainable logging practices of the time, and farming gained importance. Many farmers relocated here from the Dust Bowl conditions in the Dakotas at that time.

The Burlington Northern Railroad had a depot in Northome until the 1980s, although passenger service discontinued in 1960. Today the abandoned railroad bed forms the Blue Ox section of a large network of snowmobile trails.

It is possible that the name "Northome" is derived from the Norwegian place name "Norheim", which is found in four places in Norway. The name literally means north home.

Geography

Northome is located at  (47.871986, -94.280248).

There are named former townships around Northome (Bridgie, Englewood, Wildwood, etc.) but in Koochiching County all townships are unorganized.

Economy
Important sources of employment in the area include the Northome School, independent resorts, logging and farming, and the Shining Light Cafe. The local newspaper was the Northome Record, produced from 1905 to 2007. Shortly after the Northome Record ceased the Northome Area News was created by a local family.

The nearest stop light is 40 miles away in Bemidji, the regional shopping hub.

Wildlife
The town is on the shores of Bartlett Lake; to the south is Island Lake, popular for fishing and swimming. The lake holds Northern Pike, crappie, perch, and Bull Head. Other smaller lakes are in the area as well, together supporting a variety of fish including walleye and northern pike.  Unlike most of the rest of the Lower 48 states, timber wolves (the grey wolf) were never eradicated from this area, and wolves can still be heard at night, though rarely seen. Bald eagles and black bears are commonly sighted. There have also been occasional reports of cougar sightings. This area is in the southern part of the Taiga, or boreal forest, with a mix of quaking aspen (colloquially called popple), balsam fir, cedar and others, including some remaining white pine and Norway pine.

Demographics

2010 census
As of the census of 2010, there were 200 people, 89 households, and 53 families residing in the city. The racial makeup of the city was 97.0% White, 1.0% Native American, and 2.0% from two or more races.

There were 89 households, of which 23.6% had children under the age of 18 living with them, 44.9% were married couples living together, 11.2% had a female householder with no husband present, 3.4% had a male householder with no wife present, and 40.4% were non-families. 34.8% of all households were made up of individuals, and 18% had someone living alone who was 65 years of age or older. The average household size was 2.20 and the average family size was 2.83.

The median age in the city was 49.7 years. 22% of residents were under the age of 18; 6.5% were between the ages of 18 and 24; 16% were from 25 to 44; 32% were from 45 to 64; and 23.5% were 65 years of age or older. The gender makeup of the city was 47.5% male and 52.5% female.

2000 census
As of the census of 2000, there were 230 people, 87 households, and 46 families residing in the city. The racial makeup of the city was 96.96% White, 1.74% Native American, and 1.30% from two or more races.

There were 87 households, out of which 26.4% had children under the age of 18 living with them, 48.3% were married couples living together, 2.3% had a female householder with no husband present, and 47.1% were non-families. 42.5% of all households were made up of individuals, and 32.2% had someone living alone who was 65 years of age or older.  The average household size was 2.21 and the average family size was 3.07.

In the city, the population was spread out, with 22.6% under the age of 18, 3.9% from 18 to 24, 19.6% from 25 to 44, 23.5% from 45 to 64, and 30.4% who were 65 years of age or older.  The median age was 48 years. For every 100 females, there were 71.6 males.  For every 100 females age 18 and over, there were 61.8 males.

The median income for a household in the city was $25,417, and the median income for a family was $36,250. Males had a median income of $30,556 versus $20,375 for females. The per capita income for the city was $14,758.  About 13.0% of families and 24.2% of the population were below the poverty line, including 22.0% of those under the age of eighteen and 20.8% of those 65 or over.

Outdoor activities
Primary occupations in the area are logging timber, farming, healthcare and resorts/tourism.  The largest single employer is the Northome School.

Fall brings the deer hunters and in the winter snowmobiling is a growing activity, supporting a small industry with a network of trails leading to nearby communities, including across the Big Bog State Recreation Area to Waskish Township.  Winters also support ice-fishing, as cold temperatures occasionally dipping down to −40° (F or C) create ice that can support small snowplows to clear roads on the lakes.

Media

Television

References

External links
 City of Northome website - Link, community calendar, etc.
 Northome School website - Link, District 363
 LakesnWoods.com website -- Northome, Minn. Guide - Link, collection of Northome information

Cities in Koochiching County, Minnesota
Cities in Minnesota
1903 establishments in Minnesota